Ywangan Township is a township located within Taunggyi District, Shan State, Myanmar. It is also part of the Danu Self-Administered Zone. The principal town is Ywangan.

Information concerning this region is not easily accessible, although quality coffee is grown in the region.

References

Townships of Shan State